Laetitia du Couëdic de Kerérant (born 6 June 1996) is a Franco-Swiss equestrian rider. Her specialty is show jumping, either individually or as part of a team. She was Swiss junior champion in Lugano Switzerland in August 2013, a month after she won a gold medal at The European championship (Swiss team) at Vejer de la Frontera Spain. Laetitia du Couëdic started her official CSI programme in 2015 at the CSI5* in Zurich riding Elisa followed by Cagnes-sur-mer France on her recently acquired (From French Champion Kevin Staut, her mentor) Cheyenne 111 Z HDC. In October 2013, she won the Grand Prix U25 CSI at Chevenez (JU) and was a wild card entry for the CHI Geneva in Geneva where she was the youngest rider. Laetitia du Couëdic is ambassador of Hermès, the French Luxury goods maker. She is also an ambassador of JustWorld international, a charity project. In 2017 she won the Fontainebleau Grand Prix (CSIOY - Fontainebleau (FRA) (04/05/2017 - 07/05/2017) and was Bronze medal at Swiss championships (young riders). Laetitia has been selected for the Swiss team competing at the European Championships in Samorin (Slovakia) where she ranked 17th. She rides regularly the "Saut Hermès" in Paris, The Rolex Grand-Prix in Geneva.

Biography
Laetitia du Couëdic was born in Toronto, Canada at Mount Sinai Hospital. She grew up in Geneva, Switzerland and graduated her "Maturité Fédérale" . She has been riding as a professional since. Her parents are Anne-Catherine Spillmann
and Gonzague du Couëdic. Laetita, in 2019, joined Haras de la Chesnaye where she trains temporarily her horses.

Horses
2018

2017

2016

2015

2014

2013

Results
2017

1st - Grand Prix Classic, Fontainebleau (France) May 7, 2017, (CSIOY Table A (238.2.2a) 1.45m)

All results

References

External links
Interview - Saut Hermes 2017
Federation Equestre Internationale
Le cavalier romand Jan 2016
Info Jumping Oct 2015
Le Monde Apr, 2015 
Cheval Savoir Apr, 2014
Gold, Federation 
Le Cavalier Romand Dec, 2013
CHI Genève Oct, 2013
JumpiNews Mar, 2013

Swiss female equestrians
1996 births
Living people
Swiss show jumping riders
French nobility
Canadian female equestrians
French female equestrians
Sportspeople from Geneva